In mathematics, a (compact) taut submanifold N of a space form M is a compact submanifold with the property that for every  the distance function 

is a perfect Morse function.

References

Differential geometry
Morse theory